Maxwell Irvine Gillies AM (born 16 November 1941) is an Australian actor and a founding member of the 1970s experimental theatre company, the Australian Performing Group.

Early life and education

Gillies studied art teaching at Frankston Teachers College and featured in the theatre productions School for Scandal and Summer of the Seventeenth Doll with Kerry Dwyer in 1964. He graduated from Monash University with a Bachelor of Arts degree in 1966. He then studied secondary teaching at the Melbourne Teachers' College, now part of the University of Melbourne.

Career

In 1984–85, Gillies hosted The Gillies Report on ABC Television. This was followed in 1986 by Gillies Republic and in 1992 by Gillies and Company. He was known for his ability to dress up and parody a wide range of political figures, both on television and in live solo theatrical performances (i.e. The Big Con and Your Dreaming: The Prime Minister’s Cultural Convention). In July 2008 he resurrected his caricatures of Australia's former prime ministers in a live production of No Country for Old PMs: An Evening with Max Gillies at the Noosa Longweekend festival.

Gillies stated in an interview with The Courier-Mail that he and co-writer Guy Rundle were watching the then prime minister, Kevin Rudd, for a possible new caricature in a new production being developed. "I'm watching him closely" he said.

Personal life

He is married to publisher Louise Adler, and they have two adult children.

Accolades

Honours
Gillies became a member of the Order of Australia on New Year's Day 1990 for his services to the performing arts. In 1997, he was recognised with a Distinguished Alumni Award from Monash University and was awarded an honorary Doctor of Laws degree in 2015.

Awards
{|class="wikitable"
| Year
| Organisation
| Award
| Result
|-
| 1977
| Theatre Australia Awards
| Actor of the Year for A Stretch of the Imagination
| 
|-
| 1985
| Mo Awards
| Specialty Act of the Year
| 
|-

Caricatures

Gillies, through his television programs or theatre performances, has caricatured the following people: 
 Australian prime ministers:  Robert Menzies, Harold Holt, William McMahon, Gough Whitlam, Malcolm Fraser, Bob Hawke, Paul Keating, John Howard, Kevin Rudd.
 Other Australian politicians: Kim Beazley, Alexander Downer, Amanda Vanstone, Ian Sinclair, Philip Ruddock, Sir John Kerr, Don Chipp, Andrew Peacock, Fred Nile, Russ Hinze, Gareth Evans.
 Australian state premiers: Robert Askin, Henry Bolte, Neville Wran, Joh Bjelke-Petersen, John Bannon.
 Australian businessmen:  Kerry Packer, Rupert Murdoch, Alan Bond, John Singleton, John Elliott.
 Australian writers: Phillip Adams, Bob Ellis, Geoffrey Blainey, Clive James, Thomas Keneally, Gerard Henderson, Bob Santamaria.
 Foreign leaders: Ronald Reagan, Pik Botha, F. W. de Klerk, Margaret Thatcher, Helmut Kohl, François Mitterrand, Yasuhiro Nakasone, Mikhail Gorbachev, David Lange, Queen Elizabeth II, George H. W. Bush, George W. Bush, Pope John Paul II.
 Other people: Tony Barber, Barry Crocker, David Attenborough, Jonathan Shier, Frank Sinatra, David McNicoll, Arthur Daley (a main character from Minder)

Filmography

Film

Television

Theatre

References

External links

1941 births
Living people
Australian male film actors
Australian male television actors
Members of the Order of Australia
Australian satirists
Australian impressionists (entertainers)
Monash University alumni
People educated at Melbourne High School
Male actors from Melbourne
Australian republicans